Mahendra Bahadur Shahi was sworn in as Chief Minister of Karnali Province on 16 February 2018. Here is the list of ministers.

Chief Minister & Cabinet Ministers

Current Arrangement

February 2018 - June 2021

See also 

 Sher Dhan Rai cabinet
 Lalbabu Raut cabinet
  Astalaxmi Shakya
 Krishna Chandra Nepali cabinet
 Kul Prasad KC cabinet
 Trilochan Bhatta cabinet

References

External links 

 Office of Chief Minister and Council of Ministers of Karnali Province

Provincial cabinets of Nepal
2018 establishments in Nepal
Government of Karnali Province